The Ciornovăț (also: Cernovăț) is a right tributary of the river Caraș (Karaš) in Romania. It discharges into the Caraș in Vărădia.

References

Rivers of Romania
Rivers of Caraș-Severin County